Kneel to the Prettiest may refer to:

 Kneel to the Prettiest, a 1925 novel by Berta Ruck
 The Looking-Glass, a 1943 novel by William March, originally titled Kneel to the Prettiest